The 1996 FA Charity Shield (also known as the Littlewoods FA Charity Shield for sponsorship reasons) was the 74th FA Charity Shield, an annual football match played between the winners of the previous season's Premier League and FA Cup competitions. The match was played on 11 August 1996 at Wembley Stadium and contested by Manchester United, who had won the Double of Premier League and FA Cup in 1995–96, and Newcastle United, who had finished as runners-up in the Premier League. Manchester United won the match 4–0 with goals from Eric Cantona, Nicky Butt, David Beckham and Roy Keane.

The game saw new signings Jordi Cruyff and Karel Poborský make their debuts for Manchester United, though neither of these players had particularly successful careers at Old Trafford and both had left the club within four years. The day before the game had seen the surprise sale of one of Manchester United's longest serving players – Lee Sharpe.

The game saw Newcastle United give a debut to £15 million world record signing Alan Shearer, who would remain at the club until his retirement as a player 10 years later and break the club's goalscoring record in the process, though he would never win a major trophy with them.

Match details

References

See also
1995–96 FA Premier League
1995–96 FA Cup

1996
Charity Shield 1996
Charity Shield 1996
Charity Shield
FA Charity Shield